Hynobius glacialis, the Nanhu  salamander, is a species of salamander in the family Hynobiidae, endemic to Taiwan. Its common name refers to the type locality, Nanhu Mountain. The mountain contains glacial relic formations, the reason for the species epithet glacialis.

Nanhu salamanders are known from the northern Central Mountain Range and the Syueshan Mountain Range from above . They are parapatric with H. formosanus that occurs at lower altitudes. They live near alpine tundra, usually beside creeks, cold springs, and seepages, usually hiding during the day. Their reproductive biology remains unknown.

References

glacialis
Amphibians of Taiwan
Endemic fauna of Taiwan
Amphibians described in 2008
Taxa named by Kuang-yang Lue